The  Washington Redskins season was the franchise's 32nd season in the National Football League (NFL) and their 27th in Washington, D.C. The team tried to improve on their 5–7–2 record from 1962 but failed and finished 3-11.

Offseason

NFL Draft

Regular season

Schedule

Standings

References

Washington
Washington Redskins seasons
Washing